Coqueza (also spelled Coquesa) is one of the cantons of the Tahua Municipality, the second municipal section of the Daniel Campos Province in the Potosí Department of Bolivia. During the census of 2001 it had 102 inhabitants. Its seat is Coqueza. The village is situated at the Salar de Uyuni and south of the Tunupa volcano.

See also 
 Inkawasi Island
 Isla del Pescado

References

External links
Tahua Municipality: population data and map

Cantons of Potosí Department
Cantons of Bolivia